The Little Whiteface River (South) is a  river of Minnesota and the southern of two tributaries of the Whiteface River with the same name.

See also
List of rivers of Minnesota

References

Minnesota Watersheds
USGS Hydrologic Unit Map - State of Minnesota (1974)

Rivers of Minnesota
Rivers of St. Louis County, Minnesota